The Salzburg Music Prize was an international composition prize awarded by the state government of Salzburg. The total prize money was €80,000 (€60,000 for the main prize and €20,000 for the advancement award or encouragement prize). The prize was first awarded in the Mozart Year 2006. The award honours the life work of one of the outstanding composers of our time. From the second time in 2009, it was awarded biennially.

Recipients
 2006 Salvatore Sciarrino, Francesco Filidei
 2009 Klaus Huber, Christoph Yeznikian
 2011 Friedrich Cerha, Elena Mendoza
 2013 Georg Friedrich Haas, Aureliano Cattaneo

References

Austrian music awards
Classical music awards
Awards established in 2006
2006 establishments in Austria